The Gillies Highway is  a road that runs from Gordonvale in the Cairns Region through the Gillies Range (part of the Great Dividing Range) to Atherton in the Tablelands Region, both in Queensland, Australia. It is also known as the Gillies Range Road and was originally known as the Cairns Range Road.The highway is known for its 263 corners, and 800 m elevation change in only 19 km of road. It is a popular tourist drive and has a number of lookouts.

Route Description 

Commencing from the Bruce Highway in Gordonvale the road runs south-west, following the Mulgrave River, to the foot of the Gillies Range. It climbs the range by a winding route, generally westward, and then proceeds south through the Little Mulgrave National Park before turning west to ascend to the Atherton Tableland. It then passes north of Lake Barrine and south of Tinaroo Dam before reaching Yungaburra. From here it proceeds west to Atherton, which it enters from the north.

It also provides the only road access to the locality of Goldsborough.

History 
In September 1922, the Shire of Eacham decided to use £10,000 of funding provided under Australian and Queensland Government unemployment schemes to construct the Cairns Range Road to provide a short route from the Atherton Tableland to the Cairns hinterland. There were immediate objections to the proposed route from Gordonvale to Atherton on account of the difficult terrain with a counter-proposal to build a road from Smithfield in Cairns to Mareeba via Kuranda,  but this route would be more beneficial to the Shire of Mareeba rather than to the Shire of Eacham, so the original plan proceeded (although the Kuranda Range Road would later be built in 1940).

By March 1925, 150 men were employed building the road. It was officially opened on Saturday 10 July 1926 allowing travel between Cairns to the Tableland in 2½ hours. However, as the road was only wide enough for one-way traffic, it would flow in different directions at various times of day according to a timetable with vehicles wishing to travel in the other directions being held at Top Gate or Bottom Gate.

The Gillies Highway was named after William Gillies, a former Premier of Queensland and the local Member of the Queensland Legislative Assembly for Eacham. It was proposed to name the Cairns Range Road (as it was then known) after him following his sudden death in February 1928 but it was not made official until March 1934.

On 4 February 1987, a bus carrying Year 12 school students and teachers from the Cairns State High School came off the highway and fell down 20 metres into rainforest, killing 8 students. An inquiry established the brakes of the bus were faulty.

Upgrades
A project to improve safety on sections of the road, at a cost of $19.341 million, was scheduled for completion in December 2022.

Major intersections

References

Further reading

External links 

Highways in Queensland
Cairns Region
Tablelands Region